SJW Entertainment, is a Nigerian record label owned by Sir Justine. SJW services includes, music recording, merchandising, audiovisual content, and music publishing. The label is home to recording acts, such as Victor AD, AcebergTM, and Blaq Jerzee.

History
In 2019, Sir Justine founded Sir Justine World Entertainment, commonly known and abbreviated as SJW Entertainment, with the aim to make Nigerian music industry greater, he tells Rotimi Ige of Nigerian Tribune. Victor AD was welcomed to SJW Entertainment on 14 May 2019, with a single "Emoji", and on 26 November 2019, Blaq Jerzee signed a record deal with SJW, and AcebergTM joined its artist roaster on 14 March 2020. A month after he signed, he released his first project titled Far from Home - EP.

Roaster

Current acts

Discography

Albums/Mixtape/EP

Singles

References 

Record labels established in 2019
Hip hop record labels
Nigerian record labels
Pop record labels